Andromeda XI (And 11) is a dwarf spheroidal galaxy about 2.6 million light-years away from the Sun in the constellation Andromeda.  Discovered in 2006, And XI is a satellite galaxy of the Andromeda Galaxy (M31).

See also

 List of Andromeda's satellite galaxies

References

Andromeda (constellation)
Dwarf spheroidal galaxies
Astronomical objects discovered in 2006
Andromeda Subgroup
Local Group